The 2013 Liberty Flames football team represented Liberty University in the 2013 NCAA Division I FCS football season. They were led by second-year head coach Turner Gill and played their home games at Williams Stadium. They were a member of the Big South Conference. They finished the season 8–4, 4–1 in Big South play to share the Big South Conference title with Coastal Carolina. Due to their loss to Coastal Carolina, they did not receive the conference's automatic bid to the FCS Playoffs and did not receive an at-large bid.

Schedule

Source: Schedule

Game summaries

@ Kent State

Monmouth

Morgan State

@ Richmond

Kentucky Wesleyan

@ Old Dominion

Coastal Carolina

@ Gardner–Webb

VMI

Presbyterian

Brevard

@ Charleston Southern

References

Liberty
Liberty Flames football seasons
Big South Conference football champion seasons
Liberty Flames football